John Talley is an American politician and minister serving as a member of the Oklahoma House of Representatives from the 33rd district. Elected in November 2018, he assumed office on January 14, 2019.

Early life and education 
Talley was raised in Anadarko, Oklahoma. He earned a Bachelor of Arts degree in agriculture education from Oklahoma State University–Stillwater, where he was a member of the Oklahoma State Cowboys wrestling team.

Career 
Talley became an ordained minister in 1978. He has since worked as the chaplain of the Stillwater Police Department and Oklahoma State Cowboys football team. He was elected to the Oklahoma House of Representatives in November 2018 and assumed office on January 14, 2019. He also serves as vice chair of the House Children, Youth & Family Services Committee. In July 2021, Talley was selected to manage an interim House committee tasked with investigating clinical outcomes of patients following legislation that reduced opioid prescribing.

References 

Living people
People from Anadarko, Oklahoma
Republican Party members of the Oklahoma House of Representatives
Oklahoma State University alumni
Year of birth missing (living people)